Yang Yun may refer to:

Yang Yun (gymnast) (born 1984), Chinese gymnast
Yang Yun (footballer, born 1988) (born 1988),  Chinese footballer
Yang Yun (footballer, born 1989) (born 1989),  Chinese footballer
James Yun (born 1981), Korean American professional wrestler who used the ringname Yun Yang in World Championship Wrestling